The CBCA Award for New Illustrator (previously Crichton Award for Children's Book Illustration) is one of several awards presented annually by the Children's Book Council of Australia (CBCA).

The award was originally set up from a legacy made to the Victorian Branch of the CBCA by Wallace Raymond Crichton in 1985. The first award was presented in 1988.

In 2019, the award transferred to the CBCA Book of the Year Awards and was renamed the CBCA Award for New Illustrator. It is managed by the national awards committee and funded by the CBCA Awards Foundation.

Award category and description

The CBCA Award for New Illustrator is for recognising new talent in the field of Australian children's book illustration.

CBCA Award for New Illustrator winners (2019–present)

Crichton Award winners (1988–2018)

See also

List of CBCA Awards
 List of Australian literary awards

Notes

References
 Crichton Award Guidelines

Children's Book Council of Australia
Australian children's literary awards